An aul is a type of fortified village or town found throughout the Caucasus mountains and Central Asia.

The word itself is of Turkic origin and simply means village in many Turkic languages. Auyl is a Kazakh word meaning "village" in Kazakhstan.

The auls of Svaneti (in the Republic of Georgia), with their distinctive medieval towers, have been recognized as a World Heritage Site. Comparable towers may be found elsewhere in the Caucasus, specifically in Ingushetia.

The auls are generally built out of stone, on faces of ridges or against cliffs in order to provide protection against surprise attacks. Houses are usually two stories high, and they are staggered to make it virtually impossible for enemies to get anywhere on the roads. The houses usually have a southern aspect to take advantage of the sun in the winter and to be sheltered from the northern winds. Often, they are not located near good farmland or water sources, so it is necessary to bring water into the settlement.

In the 19th century, as Russia fought to conquer the Caucasus, auls were very formidable defences and could be taken for the most part only by storming.

References

Types of village
Populated places in Russia
Populated places in the Caucasus
Geography of the Caucasus
Rural geography
Types of populated places